Ofra may refer to:
 Ofra, an Israeli settlement located in the northern West Bank
 Ofra Haza, an Israeli singer, actress and international recording artist (1957-2000)
 Ofra Harnoy, a Canadian cellist (born 1965)
 Ofra Bikel, a documentary filmmaker, and television producer
 Ofra Strauss, an Israeli businesswoman (born 1960)
 Operation Ofra, military name for an Israeli air strike on Iraq (1981)

See also
 Orfi (disambiguation)